Henry Parry may refer to:

 Henry Parry (bishop of Perth) (1826–1893)
 Henry Parry (bishop of Worcester) (1561–1616), English bishop
 Henry Parry (priest) (c. 1766–1854), Welsh clergyman and antiquarian
 Henry Wynn Parry (1899–1994), British judge